Amycolatopsis is a genus of high GC-content bacteria within the family Pseudonocardiaceae.
The genus is known for producing many types of antibiotics, including
Epoxyquinomicin, related to Amycolatopsis sulphurea, are a class of weak antibiotic and anti-inflammatory agent.
Vancomycin, obtained from Amycolatopsis orientalis, is being used for infections resistant to other antibiotics.
Ristocetin, made by Amycolatopsis lurida, was an antibiotic but ceased to apply due to adverse effects of platelet agglutination. Now it is used to assay von Willebrand disease.

Degradation of bio-polymers 
Several bacteria from the genus Amycolatopsis are able to enzymatically hydrolyze the ester bonds of poly-lactic acid (PLA) films in aquatic medium. So far, it is one of the few known bacteria able to biodegrade the bioplastic outside compost facilities in a relatively short period of time.

Species

Amycolatopsis comprises the following species:

 A. acidicola Teo et al. 2020
 A. acididurans Teo et al. 2021
 A. acidiphila Oyuntsetseg et al. 2017
 "A. aidingensis" Li et al. 2021
 A. alba Mertz and Yao 1993
 A. albidoflava corrig. Lee and Hah 2001

 A. albispora Zhang et al. 2016
 A. alkalitolerans Narsing Rao et al. 2020
 A. anabasis Wang et al. 2020
 A. antarctica Wang et al. 2018
 A. arida Nouioui et al. 2018
 A. australiensis Tan et al. 2006
 A. azurea (Ōmura et al. 1983) Henssen et al. 1987
 A. balhimycina Wink et al. 2003
 A. bartoniae Zucchi et al. 2012
 A. benzoatilytica Majumdar et al. 2006
 A. bullii Zucchi et al. 2012
 "A. camponoti" Zakalyukina et al. 2022
 A. cappadoca Işık et al. 2019
 A. cihanbeyliensis Tatar et al. 2013
 A. circi Everest and Meyers 2012
 A. coloradensis Labeda 1995
 A. decaplanina Wink et al. 2004
 A. dendrobii Tedsree et al. 2021
 A. deserti Busarakam et al. 2017
 A. dongchuanensis Nie et al. 2012
 A. eburnea Chaiya et al. 2019
 A. echigonensis Ding et al. 2007
 A. endophytica Miao et al. 2012
 A. equina Everest and Meyers 2012

 "A. flava" Wei et al. 2015
 A. granulosa Zucchi et al. 2012

 A. halotolerans Lee 2006
 A. helveola Tamura et al. 2010
 A. hippodromi Everest and Meyers 2012
 A. japonica corrig. Goodfellow et al. 1997

 A. jejuensis Lee 2006
 A. jiangsuensis Xing et al. 2014
 A. jiguanensis Huang et al. 2021
 A. kentuckyensis Labeda et al. 2003
 A. keratiniphila Al-Musallam et al. 2003
 "A. lactamdurans" Barreiro et al. 2000
 A. lexingtonensis Labeda et al. 2003
 A. lurida (Lechevalier et al. 1986) Stackebrandt et al. 2004
 A. magusensis Camas et al. 2013
 A. marina Bian et al. 2009
 A. mediterranei (Margalith and Beretta 1960) Lechevalier et al. 1986
 A. methanolica De Boer et al. 1990
 A. minnesotensis Lee et al. 2006
 A. nigrescens Groth et al. 2007
 A. niigatensis Ding et al. 2007
 A. nivea Niu et al. 2020
 A. oliviviridis Penkhrue et al. 2018
 A. orientalis (Pittenger and Brigham 1956) Lechevalier et al. 1986
 A. palatopharyngis Huang et al. 2004
 A. panacis Peng et al. 2019
 A. pigmentata Tamura et al. 2010

 A. pithecellobii corrig. Mingma et al. 2020
 "A. pittospori" Kaewkla and Franco 2021
 A. plumensis Saintpierre-Bonaccio et al. 2005
 A. pretoriensis Labeda et al. 2003
 A. regifaucium Tan et al. 2007
 A. rhabdoformis Souza et al. 2015
 A. rhizosphaerae Thawai 2018
 A. rifamycinica Bala et al. 2004
 A. roodepoortensis Everest et al. 2015
 A. ruanii Zucchi et al. 2012
 A. rubida Huang et al. 2001

 A. saalfeldensis Carlsohn et al. 2007
 A. sacchari Goodfellow et al. 2001

 A. samaneae Duangmal et al. 2011
 A. silviterrae Jamjan et al. 2018
 A. speibonae Everest et al. 2015
 A. stemonae Klykleung et al. 2015
 A. suaedae Chantavorakit et al. 2019
 A. sulphurea Lechevalier et al. 1986
 A. taiwanensis Tseng et al. 2006
 A. thailandensis Chomchoei et al. 2011
 A. thermalba Zucchi et al. 2012
 A. thermoflava Chun et al. 1999
 A. thermophila Zucchi et al. 2012
 A. tolypomycina Wink et al. 2003
 A. tucumanensis Albarracín et al. 2010
 A. ultiminotia Lee 2009
 A. umgeniensis Everest et al. 2013
 A. vancoresmycina Wink et al. 2003
 A. vastitatis Idris et al. 2019
 A. viridis Zucchi et al. 2012
 A. xuchangensis Huang et al. 2021
 A. xylanica Chen et al. 2010

References

Pseudonocardiales
Bacteria genera